League tables for teams participating Finnish Football League Tables in Ykkönen, the second tier of the Finnish football league system, in 2007.

League table

Promotion play-offs
FC Viikingit as 13th placed team of the 2007 Veikkausliiga and RoPS as runners-up of the 2007 Ykkönen competed in a two-legged play-off for a place in the Veikkausliiga. RoPS won the play-off by 2-1 on aggregate and were promoted to the Veikkausliiga.

RoPS Rovaniemi - Viikingit Helsinki  1-0
Viikingit Helsinki - RoPS Rovaniemi  1-1

References

Ykkönen seasons
2007 in Finnish football
Fin
Fin